The 2015 JSM Challenger of Champaign–Urbana was a professional tennis tournament played on hard courts. It was the twentieth edition of the tournament which was part of the 2015 ATP Challenger Tour. It took place in Champaign, Illinois, United States between November 14 and November 21, 2015.

Singles main-draw entrants

Seeds

 1 Rankings are as of November 9, 2015.

Other entrants
The following players received wildcards into the singles main draw:
  Jared Hiltzik
  Michael Mmoh
  Dennis Nevolo
  Noah Rubin

The following players received entry from the qualifying draw:
  Mackenzie McDonald
  Chase Buchanan
  Raymond Sarmiento
  Clay Thompson

Champions

Singles

 Henri Laaksonen def.  Taylor Fritz 4–6, 6–2, 6–2

Doubles

 David O'Hare /  Joe Salisbury def.  Austin Krajicek /  Nicholas Monroe 6–1, 6–4

External links
Official Website

JSM Challenger of Champaign-Urbana
JSM Challenger of Champaign–Urbana
Champaign
2015 in sports in Illinois